Air Busan Co., Ltd., operating as Air Busan is a low-cost airline based in Busanjin-gu, Busan, South Korea. It is a subsidiary of Asiana Airlines. The airline began its operation in 2007 as Busan International Airlines Company; it launched service in October 2008.

Air Busan is South Korea's third-largest low-cost airline, carrying 4.5 million domestic and 3.6 million international passengers in 2018. Air Busan has grown international passenger traffic by 122% over the past three years, while domestic traffic has grown by 38%.

History

Busan International Airlines Co., Ltd. was established in August 2007. In February the following year, the corporate name was changed to Air Busan Co., Ltd. and an investment agreement was signed by the city of Busan and Asiana Airlines. In April 2008 the company ordered its first aircraft, five Boeing 737s. Two months later, the company was granted a license for regular air transportation. In October 2008, bases were established at Gimpo airport and Jeju international airport and the airline commenced operations between Busan and Gimpo

In April 2009, the airline took delivery of its fifth Boeing 737-400 aircraft. By August that year, Air Busan had marked 10,000 flights in the 299 days since it began operations. In September 2009, the number of passengers carried reached 1 million. International services, between Busan and Fukuoka, began in March 2010 and in April the number of passengers carried reached 2 million. In January 2011 Air Busan took delivery of its first Airbus A321-200 aircraft.

Destinations 

Air Busan started operations in October 2008, using Gimhae International Airport as a base.

, Air Busan serves the following destinations:

Codeshare agreements
The airline has codeshare agreements with the following airlines (as of May 2014):
 All Nippon Airways
 Asiana Airlines

Fleet

Current fleet
, the Air Busan Fleet consists of the following aircraft:

Retired fleet

See also
List of low-cost airlines in South Korea
Air Seoul
Eastar Jet
Jeju Air
Jin Air – low cost subsidiary of Korean Air
T'way Air

References

External links

Air Busan official homepage 
Air Busan official homepage 
City of Busan – Air Busan
Air Busan Reservations 

Airlines of South Korea
Airlines established in 2007
Asiana Airlines
South Korean brands
Companies based in Busan
Low-cost carriers
South Korean companies established in 2007
Star Alliance affiliate members